Andreas "Andy" Köpke (born 12 March 1962) is a German former professional footballer who played as a goalkeeper. After being selected for the Germany national team squads that won the 1990 FIFA World Cup and reached the quarter-finals of the 1994 FIFA World Cup, he succeeded Bodo Illgner to become Germany's first-choice goalkeeper at UEFA Euro 1996 (which Germany won) and the 1998 FIFA World Cup.

Career
Köpke began his professional club career at Holstein Kiel in the summer of 1979.

Having been chosen as the best player in Germany in 1993, his biggest achievement came in 1996, winning the European Championship and playing a pivotal role in Germany's campaign. In the last group match he saved Gianfranco Zola's penalty for Italy and also saved Gareth Southgate's penalty in the semi-final shootout victory against England in the semi-final. Due to his success with the German team he was voted FIFA goalkeeper of the year.

Köpke was also Germany's first-choice goalkeeper during their 1998 FIFA World Cup campaign, which ended in a 3–0 loss to Croatia in the quarter-finals. Having already made his decision to retire at the end of the World Cup prior to the tournament, Köpke was true to his word; his retirement paved the way for another great German keeper, Oliver Kahn. In total, Köpke played 59 matches for his country.

He retired from goalkeeping at 1. FC Nürnberg at the end of the 2000–01 2. Bundesliga season. He also played at Eintracht Frankfurt to where he transferred to from 1. FC Nürnberg in the summer of 1994, for the amount of €516,200, returning to 1. FC Nürnberg five years later in January 1999 via Olympique Marseille. Up to this day Köpke is still very much involved in German football. He currently is the goalkeeping coach of the Germany national team. He also acted as an ambassador to the city of Nuremberg, as it prepared for the 2006 FIFA World Cup. In July 2021, he announced that he would leave his position at the national team, following the UEFA Euro 2020.

Honours

Player
1. FC Nürnberg
 2. Bundesliga: 2000–01

Germany
 FIFA World Cup: 1990
 UEFA European Championship: 1996; runner-up 1992

Individual
 kicker Bundesliga Team of the Season: 1987–88, 1992–93, 1994–95
 Footballer of the Year in Germany: 1993
 UEFA European Championship Team of the Tournament: 1996
 Best European Goalkeeper: 1996
 IFFHS World's Best Goalkeeper: 1996

Goalkeeping coach
Germany
 FIFA Confederations Cup: 2017
 FIFA World Cup: 2014
 UEFA Euro runner-up: 2008 
 FIFA World Cup third place: 2006; 2010
 FIFA Confederations Cup third place: 2005

References

External links

  
 

1962 births
Living people
Sportspeople from Kiel
1990 FIFA World Cup players
1994 FIFA World Cup players
1998 FIFA World Cup players
Expatriate footballers in France
Holstein Kiel players
Hertha BSC players
Eintracht Frankfurt players
Olympique de Marseille players
1. FC Nürnberg players
Bundesliga players
2. Bundesliga players
Ligue 1 players
Association football goalkeepers
German expatriate footballers
German expatriate sportspeople in France
German footballers
Germany international footballers
FIFA World Cup-winning players
UEFA Euro 1992 players
UEFA Euro 1996 players
UEFA European Championship-winning players
Footballers from Schleswig-Holstein
Association football goalkeeping coaches
West German footballers